is a ski resort on the eastern slope of  in , Niigata Prefecture.

This ski resort was formerly run by Kokudo, and currently is run by Prince Hotel, which merged with Kokudo in 2006. Naeba is one of the most popular ski resorts in Japan due to its accessible location from Tokyo and relatively long snow season with snow making machines. On the bottom, Naeba Prince Hotel, which has 1,299 rooms, 20 restaurants, convenience stores, and other facilities, serves skiers. On top of the hotel, skiers can choose their accommodations from various types of hotels and ryokans, some of which has hot spring baths, in nearby Asagai town. 
Naeba Ski Resort composes Mt. Naeba Ski Resort with Kagura Ski Areas by combining both areas with Doragondola. On the opposite mountain across Asagai town, a small Asagai Area accommodates mainly family skiers.

The resort is 40 minutes from Echigo-Yuzawa Station on the Joetsu Shinkansen by non-stop express bus.

Skiing

Naeba hosted World Cup races in 1973, 1975, 2016 and 2020.

Other attractions
In the summer, the Naeba ski resort is home to Fuji Rock Festival.

In February,  (a.k.a. 'Yuming') holds a series of late-night concerts in the hotel's Blizzardium ballroom / an exhibition space.

References

External links

Official Site
Fuji Rock Festival
FIS Ski World Cup Races, February 10–11, 2005

Tourist attractions in Niigata Prefecture
Ski areas and resorts in Japan
Sports venues in Niigata Prefecture
Prince Hotels
Yuzawa, Niigata